Michael M. Jarmoluk, Jr. (October 22, 1922 – November 23, 2004) was an American football defensive lineman in the National Football League for the Chicago Bears, Boston Yanks, New York Bulldogs, and the Philadelphia Eagles.  He played college football at Temple University and was drafted in the seventh round of the 1945 NFL Draft by the Detroit Lions. He attended Frankford High School.

Jarmoluk went to one Pro Bowl during his ten-year career.

External links

1922 births
2004 deaths
American football defensive linemen
Temple Owls football players
Chicago Bears players
Boston Yanks players
New York Bulldogs players
Philadelphia Eagles players
Eastern Conference Pro Bowl players
Players of American football from Philadelphia